Fall River Township is a township in Greenwood County, Kansas, USA.  As of the 2010 census, its population was 206.

Geography

The streams of Durham Creek, Honey Creek, Otter Creek, Snake Creek, Tadpole Creek and Van Horn Branch run through this township, feeding into the Fall River and eventually to Fall River Lake.

References

 USGS Geographic Names Information System (GNIS)

External links
 US-Counties.com
 City-Data.com

Townships in Greenwood County, Kansas
Townships in Kansas